Xanadoses is a monotypic moth genus in the family Cecidosidae. It contains a single species, Xanadoses nielseni, which is endemic to New Zealand. X. nielseni is also known by the common name Kamahi bark scribbler. The larval host of this species is Weinmannia racemosa.

Taxonomy 
This genus and the species X. nielseni were first described by Robert J. B. Hoare and John S. Dugdale in 2003. The species is named in honour of Ebbe Nielsen. The male holotype specimen, collected as a pupa at Mount Ngongotahā, is held in the New Zealand Arthropod Collection.

Description 
X. nielseni is a small, dark coloured moth with dark metallic highlights along with pale whitish patches on its wings. The female has a wingspan of 9.5 mm while the male is slightly larger with a wingspan of 10.5 mm. The larva is coloured a white shade with a brown head and is 4.75 mm in length just prior to pupating. The pupa is light brown in colour and slender in shape.

Distribution 

This species is endemic to New Zealand. It has been collected in the Bay of Plenty and the Nelson regions.

Behaviour 
Adults have been observed on the wing in December. This species pupates inside the bark of its host tree forming a bulge in the bark at the end of a mine. The interior of the bulge is lined with silk.

Host species 

The larvae of this moth mine the bark of host plants Weinmannia racemosa, W. silvicola, Nothofagus fusca, Myrsine salicina, and Quintinia serrata, resulting in "scribble" patterns being formed on the bark of these trees. It has also been hypothesised that Knightia excelsa may also be a larval host of X. nielseni.

References

Cecidosidae
Adeloidea genera
Endemic fauna of New Zealand
Moths described in 2003
Moths of New Zealand
Taxa named by Robert Hoare
Taxa named by John Stewart Dugdale
Endemic moths of New Zealand